Rachel Melvin (born February 9, 1985) is an American actress. She is best known for her roles as Chelsea Brady on Days of Our Lives (2005–2009) and as Penny in Dumb and Dumber To.

Early life and education 
Melvin was born in Elmhurst, Illinois but moved to Phoenix, Arizona at age four, where she was raised. She has an older sister named Jessica. She graduated from Mountain Pointe High School in 2003. Melvin passed up a full scholarship to college so that she could move to California to pursue an acting career. In Los Angeles, she took acting classes every weekend.

Career 
Melvin landed her first acting job in the 2005 independent film Boo. She later won the role of Georgia LaMarque, a French girl whom Bo and Billie had been falsely led to believe was their daughter on the NBC soap opera Days of our Lives, but only appeared in five episodes. Months later, she took over the role of Chelsea Brady (originally portrayed by Mandy Musgrave). She and her dog were seen on The Tonight Show with Jay Leno, when she was randomly interviewed at a gas station for a segment. Melvin has also guest-starred on Summerland, Jack & Bobby and 8 Simple Rules. With her family, she has also appeared on Family Feud.

In 2010, Melvin starred as Kaia in Seven Deadly Sins which premiered on Lifetime alongside Dreama Walker. The first part premiered on May 23 while the second part premiered on May 24, 2010. In 2011, Melvin appeared in episodes of House M.D. and Castle.

In 2014, Melvin appeared as Penny Pinchelow in Dumb and Dumber To, portrayed Mary in Zombeavers, and Sarah in the drama thriller film Madtown.

She appeared in the final season of MTV's Awkward.

Personal life
Melvin lives in Los Angeles, California. Her idols include Meryl Streep, Mary-Louise Parker, Anne Hathaway, Cynthia Nixon and Toni Collette. Rachel Melvin is married to Kevin Barrett.

Filmography

Film

Television

References

External links 
 

1985 births
Actresses from Illinois
American soap opera actresses
American television actresses
Living people
People from Elmhurst, Illinois
21st-century American women